A guilt trip is a form of psychological manipulation.

Guilt trip may also refer to:
The Guilt Trip (album), a 1992 double album by Kramer
The Guilt Trip (film), a 2012 comedy film starring Seth Rogen and Barbra Streisand
 "Guilt Trip," a fifth-season episode of the television series Numb3rs
"Guilt Trip" (song), a song by Kanye West from the album Yeezus (2013)
 "The Guilt Trip," an episode of Derren Brown's television series Derren Brown: The Experiments